Riccardo Regno (born 12 August 1992) is an Italian footballer who plays for Pro Patria.

Biography

Bologna
Born in Bologna, Emilia–Romagna, Regno started his career at Bologna F.C. 1909. Regno was a member of the reserve team from 2009 to 2011 in national "spring" league, but also made his reserve debut in 2008–09 season, when he was a member of the U17 team for national student league (Allievi).

Livorno
In June 2011, Regno was a piece weight to sign Nico Pulzetti. Pulzetti was valued €3.3 million while Regno was valued an aggressive price €1.65 million, which made Pulzetti 's deal involved €1.65 million cash only. Regno had a one-year left in his apprentice contract with Bologna.

On 23 August 2011 Regno left for Italian third division club Portogruaro.

On 17 July 2012 Regno left for Gubbio.

In 2013, he returned to Livorno, which the club had promoted to Serie A. He wore no.6 shirt. On 31 January 2014 he left for Pontedera. In summer 2014 he was signed by Barletta.

Pro Patria
On 16 September 2015 Regno and Mirko Bigazzi were signed by Pro Patria.

International career
Regno was an unused member of Italy U16 team in 2007–08 season. In 2008–09 season he was included in the U17 team training camp. Regno also remained in the U18 team with the same age group in 2009–10 season, however yet to make a debut.

References

External links
 FIGC 
 Football.it Profile 

Italian footballers
Bologna F.C. 1909 players
U.S. Livorno 1915 players
A.S.D. Portogruaro players
A.S. Gubbio 1910 players
U.S. Città di Pontedera players
Association football defenders
Footballers from Bologna
1992 births
Living people